The Last Thing Mary Saw is a 2021 American folk horror written and directed by Edoardo Vitaletti. Set in 1843, the film follows the youngest daughter of a strict religious family who is under investigation after the mysterious death of her family's ominous matriarch.

Plot
Southold, New York, 1843. Young Mary (Stefanie Scott), blood trickling from behind the blindfold tied around her eyes, is interrogated about the events surrounding the death of her family's matriarch (Judith Roberts). As the story jumps back in time, we witness Mary, raised in a repressively religious household, finding fleeting happiness in the arms of Eleanor (Isabelle Fuhrman), the home’s maid. Her family view the girls’ relationship as an abomination to be dealt with as severely as possible, with the tension only heightened by the arrival of an enigmatic intruder (Rory Culkin) and the revelation of greater forces at work.

Cast
Stefanie Scott as Mary
Isabelle Fuhrman as Eleanor
Judith Roberts as the Matriarch
Rory Culkin as the Intruder
 P.J. Sosko as Theodore
Carolyn McCormick as Agnes
Michael Laurence as Randolph
Elijah Rayman as Matthew
Stephen Lee Anderson as the Grandfather
Tommy Buck as Eustace
Shane Coffey as Eustace's Son
Dawn McGee as Ann
Daniel Pearce as the Interrogator

Production
In December 2019, it was announced that Stefanie Scott, Isabelle Fuhrman, Judith Roberts and Rory Culkin had been cast in the film, which was scheduled to shoot in New York that month.

Release
The film had its world premiere at the Fantasia International Film Festival on August 15, 2021. It was released on Shudder on January 20, 2022.

Reception

Matt Zoller Seitz of RogerEbert.com gave the film a positive review, writing that the film "has a you-are-there feeling that's unusual in low-budget period pictures", and adding that "it feels like the opening installment in a filmmaking career worth following." Dennis Harvey of Variety also gave the film a positive review, calling it "an arresting period piece", and noting that "Vitaletti merits admiration for a debut feature whose ambitions are off the usual beaten track." Jon Mendelsohn of Comic Book Resources awarded the film three and a half stars out of five and wrote, "The Last Thing Mary Saw may be a slow burn, but its effective performances, eerie atmosphere, and explosive ending make it a must-see horror film."

Matt Donato of Paste Magazine gave the film a negative review and wrote that "The Last Thing Mary Saw feels restrained by its means-unable to emphasize its ultimate payoffs-and beholden to a tiptoe pace that won't ensnare all audiences."

References

External links
 
 

2021 horror films
2021 LGBT-related films
2020s American films
2020s English-language films
American horror films
American LGBT-related films
Films scored by Keegan DeWitt
Films set in 1843
Films set in New York (state)
Films shot in New York (state)
Folk horror films
Lesbian-related films
LGBT-related horror films
Shudder (streaming service) original programming